The 1912 Florida Gators football team represented the University of Florida during the 1912 college football season. The season was the fourth for George Pyle as the Florida Gators football team's head coach. Pyle's 1912 Florida Gators finished their seventh varsity football season with an SIAA conference record of 1–2 and an overall winning record of 5–2–1.

The 1912 season marked several first-time events for the Florida Gators, including the first full season that the Florida football team would compete as the "Florida Gators"; the first games that they played against two future rivals, the Auburn Tigers and Georgia Tech Yellow Jackets (both games were losses); their first-ever victory over the South Carolina Gamecocks; their first season played in the Southern Intercollegiate Athletic Association (SIAA); and the first time they ever participated in a post-season bowl game. Florida also claimed the state championship by beating in-state rival Stetson for the third consecutive year.

Before the season
Florida joined the Southern Intercollegiate Athletic Association, a large confederation of southern athletic programs that was the precursor to several other regional conferences, including the Southeastern Conference. This raised the profile of the young program (1912 was only the seventh academic year for the modern University of Florida) and allowed more contests against older football programs in the south and elsewhere. As Florida sportswriter and UF alumnus Tom McEwen wrote, "it was in 1912 when the Gators really ventured out into big-time football."

Schedule

Season summary

Auburn
The season began with the first-ever game against coach Mike Donahue's Auburn Tigers, a 13–27 loss. Florida was unable to gain on Auburn's line, and made its scores off Auburn miscues. "The team, the coach and the University are happy over this honorable result, and grant cheerfully that Florida is not master; but only the worthy opponent of the Southern team, which, with Vanderbilt, claims the Southern pennant." Though a loss, the Gators scored more points than any other Auburn opponent that year.

South Carolina

Sources:

In the second week of play, the Gators defeated the South Carolina Gamecocks for the first time 10–6. One writer labeled it "the most thrilling and hardest fought game ever played on University Field."

Florida came back to win down 3–0 at the half, Dummy Taylor had an 18-yard drop kick field goal. After Taylor missed a drop kick, Carolina fumbled, and Florida's Hoyle Pounds recovered for a touchdown.

Georgia Tech

Sources:

In their first time facing John Heisman's Georgia Tech team, Florida fell 6–14 in Jacksonville. Down 7–0, Florida scored after two passes from Tenney to Pounds, the first netting 40 yards. Alf McDonald made Tech's second touchdown.

The starting lineup was Mosley (left end), Coarsey (left tackle), Wilson (left guard), Watt (center), Baker (right guard), Sutton (right tackle), Pounds (right end), Buie (quarterback), Tenney (left halfback), Taylor (right halfback), McCullock (fullback).

Charleston
The Gators beat the College of Charleston 78–0. Florida used several forward passes.

Stetson
Florida gave Stetson its worst loss on the year, 23–7. This was considered Dummy Taylor's greatest game. He kicked three field goals, two extra points, and ran for a touchdown.

Mercer
The Mercer Baptists fought the Gators to a scoreless tie. Mercer outweighed Florida, and both squads attempted several field goals.  Mercer had shut out Florida each time they had met.

Tampa Athletic Club
Before the contest in Cuba, the Gators stopped in Tampa and defeated the Tampa Athletic Club 44–0. Rex Farrior, a high school senior who would become the captain of Florida's football team soon thereafter, played on the amateur home squad.

Postseason

Bacardi Bowl
In December, the Florida Gators team competed in their first ever post-season games: the Bacardi Bowl, a two-game series in Havana against squads from two Cuban athletic clubs.

The first game was held on Christmas Day, and the Gators defeated the Vedado Athletic Club, 28–0. The second game, which pitted the Gators against the Cuban Athletic Club of Havana, ended abruptly when Coach Pyle realized that the officials were running the game according to football's old rules and that the head referee was the former coach of his opponent. Pyle pulled his players off the field during the first quarter and was arrested for violating a Cuban law prohibiting a game's suspension after spectators' money had been collected. A trial was scheduled and Pyle was released on bail, at which point he, the team, and the Gators' entire traveling party quickly boarded a steamship for Tampa, an escape which caused the coach to be branded a "fugitive from justice" by Cuban authorities.

Bacardi Bowl officials declared that Florida had forfeited the second game and listed the result as a 1–0 win for the Cuban Athletic Club, while the University of Florida declared the game a 1–0 forfeit win for the Gators. In later years, the incomplete game was dropped from the university's official football record, and Florida's football teams would never again compete against a squad from Cuba.

Personnel

Line

Backfield

Subs

References

Bibliography

External links
 Bacardi Bowl game program

Florida
Florida Gators football seasons
Florida Gators football